The Great Piece of Turf is a watercolor painting by Albrecht Dürer created at his Nuremberg workshop in 1503. It is a study of a seemingly unordered group of wild plants, including dandelion and greater plantain. The work is considered one of the masterpieces of Dürer's realistic nature studies.

Background
In 1495 Dürer returned from his Wanderjahre in Italy and settled in Nuremberg, where he opened a workshop. He was only twenty-four years old at the time, but the workshop soon gained a great reputation for the high quality of his work. In 1500 he produced what is perhaps his most famous work, his Christ-like Self-Portrait. At the same time he was also creating smaller-scale works that were more focused on the study of nature, such as the Great Piece of Turf, which he painted in 1503, and the Young Hare from the year before.

Description
The watercolour shows a large piece of turf and little else. The various plants can be identified as cock's-foot, creeping bent, smooth meadow-grass, daisy, dandelion, germander speedwell, greater plantain, hound's-tongue and yarrow.

The painting shows a great level of realism in its portrayal of natural objects. Some of the roots have been stripped of earth to be displayed clearly to the spectator. The depiction of roots is something that can also be found in other of Dürer's works, such as Knight, Death, and the Devil (1513). The vegetation comes to an end on the right side of the panel, while on the left it seems to continue on indefinitely. The background is left blank, and on the right can even be seen a clear line where the vegetation ends.

Scholarly assessment
The humanist scholar Conrad Celtes compared Dürer's work to the literary work of the medieval philosopher and scientist Albertus Magnus who also based his work on the observation of nature. Along with the Wild Hare, the Great Piece of Turf had been called one of the masterpieces of this part of Dürer's work.

The composition shows little order and arrangement, the various roots, stems and flowers seem to be in opposition to each other. The apparent chaos, combined with the attentive detail of each individual plant, lends the painting greater realism. Though the composition of vegetation in itself is continuous and seemingly disorganised, the blank background provides a contrast to the chaos, and imposes a sense of order.

Though this work has been highly valued by later art historians, a realistic representation of nature was not a goal in itself for Dürer, but simply a tool for better conveying the sacred messages of his greater works. The Great Piece of Turf was primarily a study that would help him in the development of his art. The results can be seen both in his paintings, and in his highly detailed engravings, such as Adam and Eve from 1504.

References

External links
The painting's page at the Albertina.
Smarthistory: The Large Piece of Turf, commentary by Beth Harris and Steven Zucker
 Inside the large piece of turf (Vimeo) - a fly-through 3-D computer simulation of the sedges, grasses and reeds in the composition

Watercolours by Albrecht Dürer
1503 paintings
Landscape paintings
Collections of the Albertina, Vienna